Verkh-Payva is a rural locality (a selo) in Bayevsky District, Altai Krai, Russia. The population was 645 as of 2016. There are 18 streets.

Geography 
Verkh-Payva is located within the West-Siberian Plain, 55 km northwest of Bayevo (the district's administrative centre) by road. Verkh-Chumanka is the nearest rural locality.

Ethnicity 
The village is inhabited by Russians, Ukrainians and Germans.

References 

Rural localities in Bayevsky District